The Men's 50 metre rifle 3 positions event at the 2008 Summer Paralympics took place on September 10 at the Beijing Shooting Range Hall.

Qualification round

Q Qualified for final

Final

References

Shooting at the 2008 Summer Paralympics